Tomas Adedayo Adeyinka (born September 2000), commonly known by his stage name Offica, is an Irish rapper of Nigerian descent. During a youth soccer career between 2016 and 2019, he released his debut single "No Hook" in 2018, going viral following the release of "Naruto Drillings" in 2019 and "Plugged In Freestyle" alongside drill collective A92 in 2020.

Early life 
Tomas Adeyinka was born in Lagos, Nigeria in 2000. At the age of six, his family moved to Drogheda, Ireland, where he currently lives. Tomas's sister, Victoria, is a social media personality, and has been accredited by The Irish Times as "the most popular TikTok creator in Ireland". He is a Christian, and is studying global business at Maynooth University.

Prior to his musical career, Tomas played for Drogheda United F.C.'s under-17 team as a midfielder in the 2016–17 season; he appeared in 21 games. He joined its under-19 team in March 2018; by 2019, he played as a substitute, having appeared in 11 games (as well as one game for Drogheda United in the 2018–19 Leinster Senior Cup) in the 2018–19 season.

Career 
Offica released his debut single "No Hook" in late 2018, at the age of 18; the single gained over 100,000 views on YouTube. In an interview with Hot Press, he stated that

In 2019, he released his breakout single "Naruto Drillings", later releasing a remix with British YouTuber KSI, which gained 900,000 views the day after its release on YouTube. He later released "Skiddibop", featuring Fizzler, a British rapper, in November.

Offica released three singles, "Face Reveal", "Where's The Motive?" with Blanco and Reggie, and "Opor", in 2020. He was also featured on "Movie" by Evans Junior, which was released the same year. Regarding "Opor", Ben Beaumont-Thomas, music editor for The Guardian, said in 2021:

In mid-2020, the drill collective A92, based around Offica's hometown of Drogheda, was formed, with Offica joining following its formation; its debut single, "A9 Link Up", was released in September. The group would later rise to popularity following the release of its "Plugged In Freestyle".

In January 2021, Offica released "TAKE IT (YUCK)", later starring on Versatile's "Babyproof", which was released in March. In April, Offica announced that he would be going on tour in Ireland and the UK; he also announced that he would be releasing an untitled mixtape. In May, Offica released "Obito"; its music video gained over 320,000 views in the three days after its release on YouTube.

Discography

Singles

As lead artist

As featured artist

Guest appearances

Filmography

Awards and nominations

References 

Irish rappers
Living people
2000 births
Republic of Ireland association footballers
Nigerian footballers
Drogheda United F.C. players
Musicians from Lagos
Association football midfielders